The 2019 European Athletics Indoor Championships was held between 1 and 3 March 2019 at the Emirates Arena in Glasgow, Scotland. This was the second time this event was held in the city after the 1990 edition and the third time it was held in the United Kingdom, following the 2007 Edition in Birmingham, England. The three-day competition featured 13 men's and 13 women's athletics events and took place over three morning and three afternoon sessions.

Bids
Apeldoorn, Glasgow, Minsk and Toruń all submitted bids to host the 2019 European Indoor championships. Glasgow were chosen to host the 35th edition of the event with 9 votes ahead of Toruń with 6 votes and Apeldoorn with 1. It is 29 years since Glasgow had last hosted the championships.

Schedule

Source:

Men's results

Track

Field

Combined

Women's results

Track

Field

Combined

Medal table

Participating nations
There was a total of 582 participants from 47 nations down from the 637 originally entered. Although originally announced, no  athlete from Albania or Kosovo showed up.

 (1)
 (2)
 (8)
 (11)
 (2)
 (17)
 (14)
 (3)
 (6)
 (5)
 (4)
 (21)
 (6)
 (4)
 (13)
 (40)
 (1)
 (27)
 (2)
 (47)
 (16)
 (12)
 (2)
 (15)
 (2)
 (24)
 (10)
 (9)
 (5)
 (2)
 (1)
 (1)
 (15)
 (1)
 (17)
 (28)
 (13)
 (12)
 (1)
 (10)
 (9)
 (8)
 (42)
 (30)
 (16)
 (15)
 (32)

References

External links

Official website
EAA competition website
Results Handbook with Competition Schedule and Entry Lists, on: rfea.es (pdf 1,6 MB)

 
European Athletics Indoor Championships
International sports competitions in Glasgow
European Athletics Indoor Championships
Athletics Indoor Championships
European Athletics Indoor Championships
2010s in Glasgow
International athletics competitions hosted by Scotland
European Athletics